Richard Wogan Talbot, 2nd Baron Talbot of Malahide PC (1766 – 29 October 1849), was an Anglo-Irish politician.

Talbot was the son of Richard Talbot, of Malahide Castle, and Margaret Talbot, 1st Baroness Talbot of Malahide, daughter of James O'Reilly and sister of Sir Hugh O'Reilly (later Nugent), 1st Baronet, and Andreas O'Reilly. Thomas Talbot and Sir John Talbot were his younger brothers.

He was elected as the MP for Dublin County in the Parliament of Ireland in May 1790, sitting until March 1791 when it was ruled that he had not been duly elected.

He was returned to the Parliament of the United Kingdom as one of two representatives for County Dublin in 1807, a seat he held until 1830. In 1834 he succeeded his mother in the barony. This was an Irish peerage and did not entitle him to an automatic seat in the House of Lords. In 1836 he was sworn of the Irish Privy Council. Three years later he was raised to the Peerage of the United Kingdom as Baron Furnival, of Malahide in the County of Dublin, which gave him a seat in the House of Lords.

Lord Talbot of Malahide died in October 1849. He had no surviving male issue and the barony of Furnival died with him. He was succeeded in the Irish barony by his younger brother, James.

References

External links

1766 births
1849 deaths
Barons in the Peerage of Ireland
Eldest sons of British hereditary barons
Members of the Privy Council of Ireland
Members of the Parliament of the United Kingdom for County Dublin constituencies (1801–1922)
Irish MPs 1790–1797
Richard
UK MPs 1807–1812
UK MPs 1812–1818
UK MPs 1818–1820
UK MPs 1820–1826
UK MPs 1826–1830
Talbot of Malahide, B2
UK MPs who were granted peerages
Members of the Parliament of Ireland (pre-1801) for County Dublin constituencies
Peers of the United Kingdom created by Queen Victoria